La Esperanza is a city in Northern Peru, capital of the district La Esperanza in Trujillo Province of the region La Libertad. This city is located some 4 km north of the Historic Centre of Trujillo city.

Nearby cities
Trujillo, Peru
Víctor Larco Herrera

See also
La Libertad Region
Simbal
Moche River

External links
Location of La Esperanza by Wikimapia

References

Populated places in La Libertad Region
Cities in La Libertad Region